Modern High School is a co-educational institution in Narayanpet, Telangana, India. It was established in 1990. By AL Makkah edu society. Founder is Mohd Ismail Badruddin a Retd teacher.  Eng and اردو media. 

Alumuni of school are at top position as mention.

Al-Makkah Educational Society Patron are M A Nayeem and Dr Salam
President Alhaj Khaleel Ahmed Taj
Vice President Aleemuddin Chand
G.Secretary Mohd Hidayatullah 
Jt Secretary Nazeer Ahmed Sofi
Jt Secretary Nizamuddin Chand
Organization Secretary & Correspondent Alhaj Mohd Abdul Qadeer Sundkey.

See also
Education in India
List of schools in India

References

External links 

2006 establishments in Andhra Pradesh
Educational institutions established in 2006
Mahbubnagar district
High schools and secondary schools in Telangana